Stephen Butcher (born 1946) is a British television director (Coronation Street, Emmerdale, Eldorado, The Grunts, others).

External links

1946 births
Living people
British television directors